Bărăția is one of the Roman Catholic churches in Bucharest, Romania. It is located in central Bucharest, on the I. C. Brătianu Boulevard, next to Piața Unirii.

Name
Its name, used in antiquated Romanian for several Catholic churches, is derived from a Hungarian word of Slavic origin, barát, meaning "brother" or "monk".

History
The history of the church can be traced back to 1314, when Franciscan friars built a wooden church near the early settlements at the location of present-day Bucharest, mainly for Italian merchants traveling to the Byzantine Empire.

Bucharest was founded in 1459, and the wooden church rebuilt several times. In 1629-1633, a new stone church was constructed by Franciscan friars from the Province of Bulgaria. In 1716, the Wallachian Prince Ștefan Cantacuzino promised that he would repair it, but he had to abdicate that same year. Leopold I donated 1,500 golden ducats for the repairs, to which Prince Nicholas Mavrocordatos contributed a further 280 ducats, and the work was finished in 1741.

The church burnt down during the 1847 Bucharest fire and its reconstruction, which ended in 1848, was financed by the Imperial House of Vienna, which donated 4,000 guilders. The big bell was cast in 1855, being financed by Emperor Franz Joseph I of Austria.

During the Communist era, many buildings of the parish were demolished or confiscated by the State. The church underwent a major renovation in 1954.

Bărăția today
Masses are celebrated three times on weekdays and six times on Sunday; including those in Hungarian and German languages for the city's minorities.

References
Karl Auner, Geschichte der bukarester Baratzie, Bucharest, 1904
Raymund Netzhammer, Über religiöse Verhältnisse in Rumänien, Salzburg, 1902

External links
History and information (in Romanian)

Baratia
Roman Catholic churches completed in 1848
Gothic Revival church buildings in Romania
19th-century Roman Catholic church buildings in Romania
Historic monuments in Bucharest